Konstantinos "Kostas" Papadakis (Greek: Κωνσταντίνος "Κώστας" Παπαδάκης; born September 27, 1998) is a Greek professional basketball player for AEK Athens of the Greek Basket League and the Basketball Champions League. He is a 1.91 m (6'3") tall combo guard.

Professional career
Papadakis began his club career with Panathinaikos, in 2015. He was loaned to Kolossos, prior to the 2016–17 Greek Basket League season. He spent three seasons there, appearing in 22, 24 and 35 games, respectively, and averaging around 2.4 points per game. 

On August 11, 2020, Papadakis was once again loaned to Larisa. With Larisa, Papadakis averaged 6.5 points, 1.9 rebounds, and 2.3 assists, playing 17.3 minutes per contest. 

Papadakis spent the 2021-22 campaign with Iraklis and in 23 games, he averaged 7 points, 2.3 rebounds and 3.3 assists, shooting 33% from the 3-point line and playing around 23 minutes per contest. 

On August 26, 2022, Papadakis signed a one-year contract with AEK Athens.

National team career
As a member of the junior national team of Greece, Papadakis played at the 2016 FIBA Europe Under-18 Championship.

Awards and accomplishments
 Greek League champion: 2020
 Greek Cup Winner: 2016

References

External links
FIBA Profile
Eurobasket.com Profile
Greek Basket League Profile

1998 births
Living people
AEK B.C. players
Greek Basket League players
Greek men's basketball players
Iraklis Thessaloniki B.C. players
Kolossos Rodou B.C. players
Larisa B.C. players
Panathinaikos B.C. players
Point guards
Shooting guards
Basketball players from Athens